The Princess Tower is a 101-story,  tall residential-only skyscraper located in the Marina district of Dubai, UAE. As of September 2022, Princess Tower is the third tallest building in Dubai, after the Burj Khalifa and Marina 101 and the 36th tallest building in the world. Princess Tower was the tallest residential building in the world from 2012 to 2015, when it was overtaken by 432 Park Avenue in New York City.

Overview
The tower's engineering was performed by Syed Majid Hashmi as the Chief Structural Engineer and his deputy manager Mohammad Ali Alogaily.

The building comprises 763 units, 957 underground parking bays (spread over six floors), and eight retail outlets. The building was completed and delivered by its developer, Tameer Holdings, in September 2012.

The development stands at 107 stories and includes basement floors, a ground floor and 100 levels above ground.

The development also features an indoor swimming pool, outdoor swimming pool, fully functioning gymnasium, sauna, steam room, exercise studio, multiple games rooms, children's play area, banqueting hall and an Observation Deck on the 97th floor with Wifi access.

Construction gallery

See also 
List of tallest buildings in Dubai
List of buildings with 100 floors or more
List of tallest buildings in the United Arab Emirates
List of tallest residential buildings in the world
World One

References

External links 

 Tameer.net

Residential skyscrapers in Dubai
Residential buildings completed in 2012
Postmodern architecture in Dubai